Michel Veillette (born 6 October 1939) was a Liberal party member of the House of Commons of Canada. He was an agricultural technologist and manager by career.

He represented the Quebec riding of Champlain at which he was elected in 1979 and again in 1980. After serving in the 31st and 32nd Canadian Parliaments, he was defeated by Michel Champagne of the Progressive Conservative party in the 1984 election.

Veillette made another unsuccessful attempt to re-enter Parliament in the 1993 federal election, but earned fewer votes than Champagne who in turn lost his seat to Réjean Lefebvre of the Bloc Québécois.

Electoral record

External links
 

1939 births
Liberal Party of Canada MPs
Living people
Members of the House of Commons of Canada from Quebec
Veillette family